James Brogan (born 1890) was a professional footballer who played for Bristol Rovers prior to the First World War.

Brogan joined Rovers in 1910, having previously been playing football in Glasgow. He made 106 Southern League appearances at inside forward and scored 24 goals prior to the outbreak of war, and was Rovers' top goalscorer in the 1912–13 season with eleven goals. After the conflict he played in Scotland with Airdrieonians and St Bernard's.

References

Sources

1890 births
Year of death missing
Scottish footballers
Association football inside forwards
Bristol Rovers F.C. players
Footballers from Hamilton, South Lanarkshire
Airdrieonians F.C. (1878) players
St Bernard's F.C. players
Bathgate F.C. players
Scottish Football League players
Southern Football League players